Lucky Chicken Games is an American video game developer founded in 1998 in Santa Monica, California by Jamie Ottilie, Matt Saia and Jonnathan Hilliard.

It was purchased by mobile game publisher Abandon Mobile in 2005 and became the production and development operation of the mobile game company.  Although Lucky Chicken Games no longer exists as a distinct entity, some of Abandon Mobile's internally developed games credit "Lucky Chicken Games" as the developer, as do games developed by Abandon Mobile for other publishers.

Games
Hot Wheels Stunt Track Driver
BattleTanx (Game Boy Color)
SeaStrike
Land Before Time Dinosaur Arcade
Tyco RC: Assault With a Battery
Matchbox Emergency Patrol
Casper: Spirit Dimensions
Robotech: The Macross Saga
Aquaman: Battle for Atlantis
Tonka: Rescue Patrol (2003)
Underworld: The Eternal War
NHRA 2005 Championship Drag Racing
Emergency Patrol

References

External links
Lucky Chicken Games website
Abandon Mobile website
Lucky Chicken Games on MobyGames

Video game companies established in 1998
Video game development companies
Video game companies of the United States